Roger Laouenan (28 August 1932 – 30 March 2022) was a French writer and historian.

Biography
Born into a family with a peasantry background, Laouenan became a journalist with Le Télégramme. He was the author of the series Les Bretons dans la Grande guerre, a reference for the history of experiences by the Bretons in World War I.

Laouenan died in Lannion on 30 March 2022, at the age of 89.

Bibliography
La Nuit du pendu (1959)
Le Dernier Breton (1978)
Anjela Duval (1982)
Le Tocsin de la moisson (1994)
La Moisson rouge (1994)
Les Fiancés de la Toussaint (1996)
Nous les poilus (1998)
Les Coquelicots de la Marne (1994)
Les Semailles de guerre (2000)
Le Pays de Lannion dans la grande guerre (2002)
Le Moral de l'arrière, Le Trégor dans la Grande Guerre (2002)
Les Poilus : Dans les tranchées de la Grande Guerre (2003)
Ce soir d'août (2004)
Des Demoiselles au feu : L'épopée des fusiliers marins (2004)
Le pain bleu (2009)
Le repaire du papillon (2011)
Les Bretons sous les gaz (2014)

References

1932 births
2022 deaths
20th-century French writers
21st-century French writers
Writers from Brittany
Breton historians
People from Côtes-d'Armor